Constantin Rusu (born May 17, 1994) is a Moldovan kickboxer, currently competing in the lightweight division of ONE Championship. He is the former KOK and FEA welterweight champion. A professional competitor since 2016, Rusu has also competed for Colosseum Tournament and Dynamite Fighting Show in Romania.

As of November 2022, he is ranked the #9 welterweight kickboxer in the world by Beyond Kick and #8 by Combat Press.

Kickboxing career

King of Kings
Rusu faced Denis Apavaloae at KOK Hero’s World Series on September 30, 2017. He won the fight by a first-round knockout. Rusu next faced Pavel Pravashynski at KOK World GP 2017 In Moldova on December 9, 2017. He once again won the fight by first-round stoppage, as he knocked Pravashynski out with a flurry of punches at the 1:37 minute mark.

These two victories earned him a place in the 2018 King of Kings welterweight "Hero's Tournament", which took place on March 24, 2018. Rusu faced Matteo Calzetta in the semifinals of the one-day tournament and beat him by unanimous decision. He advanced to the finals, where he faced his countryman Dorel Cristian. Rusu won the fight and the tournament title by a narrow split decision.

Rusu faced the two-time World Boxing Council Muaythai champion Cheick Sidibé in an 80 kilogram bout at the July 4, 2018, Tatneft Cup event. He won the fight by unanimous decision. Rusu made his second consecutive Tatneft Cup appearance against Victor Monfort on August 24, 2018, once again in an 80 kilogram bout. He won the fight by unanimous decision.

Rusu was expected to face the reigning  King of Kings Welterweight (-77 kg) champion Zaurs Džavadovs at KOK Fight Series 2018 in Riga on October 27, 2018. The pair previously fought in the finals of the 2017 KOK Hero's welterweight tournament, with Džavadovs winning their first meeting by unanimous decision. Džavadovs withdrew from the bout on October 26, due to problems with his vision, and was stripped of the belt. Džavadovs was diagnosed with diplopia a few months before the title fight was supposed to take place. As his condition worsened in the days leading up to the fight, he wasn't cleared to compete at the pre-fight medical check. Rusu was rescheduled to face Latvian Aleksejs Marizihins for the vacant title at the same event. He won the fight by unanimous decision.

FEA
Rusu made his FEA Fighting Entertainment Association promotional debut against Chico Kwasi at FEA World Series 27 on December 8, 2018. He won the fight by unanimous decision. 

Rusu was then placed in the 2018 FEA Welterweight tournament, held to crown the FEA Welterweight (-77 kg) champion. He faced Alan Scheinson in the semifinals of the one-day tournament at FEA 28 on March 30, 2019. He won the fight by a second-round technical knockout, forcing a referee stoppage with a flurry of punches at the 1:53 minute mark. Rusu faced Dorel Cristian in the finals. He previously fought Cristian in the finals of the 2018 KOK Hero's Welterweight Tournament, when was able to beat him by split decision. Rusu was more convincing in the rematch, as he was needed just 53 seconds to knock his opponent out.

Rusu faced Ricardo Fernades for the vacant WKL Middleweight (-75 kg) K-1 title at Fighting Championship Events on June 8, 2019. He won the fight by decision.

Rusu moved down in weight in order to take part in the 2019 FEA Lightweight tournament. He was booked to face Furkan Karabag in the semifinals of the one-day tournament, which took place on August 17, 2019. Although Rusu was able to beat Karabag by split decision, he suffered a decision loss to Zhora Akopyan in the finals. The bout with Akopyan was ruled a draw after the first three rounds were contested, but a unanimous decision was awarded to the Armenian fighter after an extra fourth round was fought.

Rusu was stripped of the King of Kings Welterweight (-77 kg) Championship on December 2, 2019, due to inactivity.

Rusu faced Pavel Grishanovich at FEA: Keep Grinding 2 on December 7, 2019. He won the fight by unanimous decision. Rusu faced Mina Manoli at FEA Kickboxing: Reset on March 13, 2021, following a fifteen-month absence from the sport. He won the fight by unanimous decision.

Dynamite Fighting Show
In December 2021, it was reported that Robin Ciric, who had been slated to co-headline DFS 13 show against Florin Lambagiu on December 15, had tested positive for COVID-19, and that Rusu would be stepping in for Ciric. Rusu won the fight by an upset unanimous decision. He was nominated for a Debut of the Year award by the promotion.

ONE Championship
Rusu faced Marouan Toutouh in his ONE Championship debut at ONE 158 on June 3, 2022. He won the fight by unanimous decision. Rusu scored the sole knockdown of the fight in the first round, as he dropped Toutouh with a spinning backfist.

Rusu faced Islam Murtazaev at ONE 162 on October 21, 2022, stepping in as a short-notice replacement for Nieky Holzken, who withdrew with an injury. At the weigh-ins, Rusu failed hydration test and was forced to take a catchweight, coming in at 173.25 lbs, 3.25 pounds over the limit. Rusu won the fight by unanimous decision.

Championships and accomplishments
Dynamite Fighting Show  
2021 Debut of the Year nomination
King of Kings
2018 KOK Welterweight Championship
2018 KOK Hero's Welterweight Tournament Winner
2017 KOK Hero's Welterweight Tournament Runner-up 
FEA Fighting Entertainment Association
2018 FEA Welterweight Championship
2019 FEA Lightweight Tournament Runner-up
World Kickboxing League
2019 WKL Middleweight (-75 kg) K-1 Championship

Kickboxing record

|-
|- style="background:#cfc;"
| 2022-10-21 || Win ||align=left| Islam Murtazaev || ONE 162 || Kuala Lumpur, Malaysia || Decision (Unanimous) || 3 || 3:00 
|-
|- style="background:#cfc;"
| 2022-06-03 || Win ||align=left| Marouan Toutouh || ONE 158 || Kallang, Singapore || Decision (Unanimous) || 3 || 3:00
|-
|- style="background:#cfc;"
| 2021-12-15 || Win ||align=left| Florin Lambagiu || Dynamite Fighting Show 13 || Bucharest, Romania || Decision (Unanimous) || 3 || 3:00
|-
|- style="background:#fbb;"
| 2021-10-23 || Loss ||align=left| Vasilii Semenov || RCC 17 || Yekaterinburg, Russia || Decision (Unanimous) || 3 || 3:00
|-
|- style="background:#cfc;"
| 2021-03-13 || Win ||align=left| Mina Manoli || FEA Kickboxing: Reset || Chișinău, Moldova || Decision (Unanimous) || 3 || 3:00
|-
|- style="background:#cfc;"
| 2019-12-07|| Win ||align=left| Pavel Grishanovich || FEA: Keep Grinding 2 || Chișinău, Moldova || Decision (Unanimous) || 3 || 3:00
|-
|- style="background:#fbb;"
| 2019-08-17 || Loss||align=left| Zhora Akopyan || FEA WGP, -71 kg Tournament Final || Odesa, Ukraine || Ext.R Decision (Unanimous) || 4 || 3:00
|-
! style=background:white colspan=9 |
|-
|- style="background:#cfc;"
| 2019-08-17 || Win ||align=left| Furkan Karabag || FEA WGP, -71 kg Tournament Semifinal || Odesa, Ukraine || Decision (Split) || 3 || 3:00
|-
|- style="background:#cfc;"
| 2019-06-08 || Win ||align=left| Ricardo Fernandes || Fighting Championship Events || Lisbon, Portugal || Decision || 5 || 3:00
|-
! style=background:white colspan=9 |
|-
|- style="background:#cfc;"
| 2019-03-30 || Win ||align=left| Dorel Cristian || FEA 28, Welterweight Tournament Final || Chișinău, Moldova || TKO (Referee stoppage) || 1 || 0:53 
|-
! style=background:white colspan=9 |
|-
|- style="background:#cfc;"
| 2019-03-30 || Win ||align=left| Alan Scheinson || FEA 28, Welterweight Tournament Semifinal || Chișinău, Moldova || TKO (Punches) || 2 || 1:53
|-
|- style="background:#cfc;"
| 2018-12-08 || Win ||align=left| Chico Kwasi || FEA 27 || Chișinău, Moldova || Decision (Unanimous) || 3 || 3:00
|-
|- style="background:#cfc;"
| 2018-10-27 || Win ||align=left| Aleksejs Marizihins || KOK Fight Series 2018 in Riga || Riga, Latvia || Decision (Unanimous) || 5 || 3:00
|-
! style=background:white colspan=9 |
|-
|- style="background:#cfc;"
| 2018-08-24 || Win ||align=left| Victor Monfort || Tatneft Cup || Kazan, Russia || Decision (Unanimous) || 3 || 3:00
|-
|- style="background:#cfc;"
| 2018-07-04 || Win ||align=left| Cheick Sidibé || Tatneft Cup, -80 kg Prestige Fight || Kazan, Russia || Decision (Unanimous) || 3 || 3:00
|-
|- style="background:#cfc;"
| 2018-03-24 || Win ||align=left| Dorel Cristian || KOK 36 Hero's World Series, Welterweight Tournament Final || Chișinău, Moldova || Decision (Split) || 3 || 3:00
|-
! style=background:white colspan=9 |
|-
|- style="background:#cfc;"
| 2018-03-24 || Win ||align=left| Matteo Calzetta || KOK 36 Hero's World Series, Welterweight Tournament Semifinal || Chișinău, Moldova || Decision (Unanimous) || 3 || 3:00
|-
|- style="background:#cfc;"
| 2017-12-09 || Win ||align=left| Pavel Pravashynski || KOK World GP 2017 In Moldova || Chișinău, Moldova || TKO (Punches) || 1 || 1:37
|-
|- style="background:#cfc;"
| 2017-09-30 || Win ||align=left| Denis Apăvăloae || KOK Hero’s World Series || Chișinău, Moldova || KO (Body shot) || 1 || 1:45
|-
|- style="background:#cfc;"
| 2017-08-23 || Win ||align=left| Sahab Vagapov || Akhmat Fight Show || Kazan, Russia || KO (Body kick) ||  || 
|-
|- style="background:#cfc;"
| 2017-07-14 || Win ||align=left| Adrian Cibu || Colosseum Tournament 3: Romania vs. Germany || Constanța, Romania || KO (Knee to the body) || 2 || 2:02
|-
|- style="background:#cfc;"
| 2017-06-17 || Win ||align=left| Alin Cîmpan || Colosseum Tournament 2 || Ploiești, Romania || Decision (Unanimous) || 3 || 3:00
|-
|- style="background:#cfc;"
| 2017-04-01 || Win ||align=left| Emilian Sîngeorzan || Colosseum Tournament 1 || Ploiești, Romania || TKO (Referee stoppage) || 2 || 3:00
|-
|- style="background:#fbb;"
| 2017-02-25 || Loss ||align=left| Zaurs Džavadovs || KOK Hero’s Series 2017 In Riga, Welterweight Tournament Finals || Riga, Latvia || Decision (Unanimous) || 3 || 3:00
|-
! style=background:white colspan=9 |
|-
|- style="background:#cfc;"
| 2017-02-25 || Win ||align=left| Danny Richards || KOK Hero’s Series 2017 In Riga, Welterweight Tournament Semifinals || Riga, Latvia || TKO (Referee stoppage) || 1 || 1:10
|-
|- style="background:#c5d2ea;"
| 2016-12-10 || Draw ||align=left| Andrei Terenti || KOK World GP 2016 Moldova || Chișinău, Moldova || Decision (Unanimous) || 3 || 3:00
|-
|- style="background:#fbb;"
| 2016-09-06|| Loss ||align=left| Dmitry Menshikov || TATNEFT CUP, -80 kg Tournament Quarter Final || Russia || TKO (Straight Right) || 2 || 2:25
|-
|- style="background:#cfc;"
| 2016-03-20 || Win ||align=left| Cezar Buzdugan || GP Tracia 33 || Cluj-Napoca, Romania || Decision (Unanimous) || 3 || 3:00
|-
| colspan=9 | Legend:

See also
 List of male kickboxers

References

Living people
1998 births
ONE Championship kickboxers
Sportspeople from Chișinău
Moldovan male kickboxers
Moldovan people of Romanian descent

External links
Profile at Dynamite Fighting Show